The country of Bolivia hosts numerous active and extinct volcanoes across its territory. The active volcanoes are in western Bolivia making up the Cordillera Occidental, the western limit of the Altiplano plateau. Many of the active volcanoes are international mountains shared with Chile. All Cenozoic volcanoes of Bolivia are part of the Central Volcanic Zone (CVZ) of the Andean Volcanic Belt that results due to processes involved in the subduction of Nazca Plate under the South American Plate. The Central Volcanic Zone is a major upper Cenozoic volcanic province.
Apart from Andean volcanoes the geology of Bolivia host the remnants of ancient volcanoes around the Precambrian Guaporé Shield in the eastern part of the country.

See also
List of glaciers in South America
Lists of volcanoes

Notes

References 

 
Volcanoes
Bolivia
.